Metus is a genus of three species of lichenized fungi in the family Cladoniaceae. The genus was circumscribed by lichenologists David John Galloway and Peter Wilfred James in 1987, with Metus conglomeratus as the type species. All three species are found in the Southern Hemisphere.

Galloway and James suggested a placement of the genus in Cladoniaceae, a classification that was later supported with phylogenetic analysis.

Species
Metus conglomeratus 
Metus efflorescens 
Metus pileatus

References

Cladoniaceae
Lichen genera
Lecanorales genera
Taxa described in 1987